

Current listings

|}

Former listings

|}

References 

 
Polk County